The Table may refer to:
 The Table (British Columbia) in British Columbia, Canada
 The Table (1973 film), a 1973 short film, written by Adrian Lyne and Michael Hayes
 The Table (2016 film), a 2016 South Korean drama film
 The Table (EP), 2019 EP by NU'EST
 The Table (punk band), a punk rock band from Cardiff, Wales
 The Table (restaurant), a restaurant at Colaba, Mumbai, India

See also
Table (disambiguation)